The Rights of Man: A Story of War's Red Blotch is a 1915 American silent drama film directed by Jack Pratt, with titles by Louis Reeves Harrison.  The film stars George Clark, Richard Buhler, and Rosetta Brice.

Cast list
George Clark as Prince Sigismund
Richard Buhler as Dr. Carew
Rosetta Brice as Princess Lorha
Francis Joyner as His Royal Highness
Charles Brandt as General Brun
Walter Law as American ambassador
Florence Williams as His wife
Margaret Moore as Red Cross nurse
Marie Sterling as Lady of the court
Clara Lambert as Another lady of the court
Richard Wangemann as Johann
Bernard Siegel as Karl
William Carr as Frederich
George Bliss as Peasant

References

1915 films
1915 drama films
Silent American drama films
American silent feature films
1910s English-language films
American black-and-white films
Films directed by Jack Pratt
Lubin Manufacturing Company films
1910s American films
English-language drama films